Katja Abel (born April 8, 1983) is a German artistic gymnast. She competed at the 2008 Summer Olympics. Abel helped the German team finish in 12th place. Her best individual result was 32nd place on uneven bars. Her most notable achievement is a bronze medal on vault at the 2006 European Women's Artistic Gymnastics Championships.

Biography
Abel started training in gymnastics with her mother Irene Abel, an Olympic medalist in 1972. Her career was marred with injuries that stopped her from competing in the 2000 and 2004 Olympics. First she had back problems throughout 2000. Later, on 6 February 2004 she fractured bones in both forearms after falling from uneven bars. She had a long recovery, and in 2005 competed only on balance beam, with a minimum load on her arms. In 2006, she won a European bronze medal on vault, but later during the year she suffered ligament injuries in both feet and missed the world championships. Those injuries required two surgeries in 2008 and 2009 and resulted in her skipping the vault at the 2008 Olympics. In early 2007 she moved from her native Berlin to Stuttgart, seeking a team environment. In Stuttgart she trained with Marie-Sophie Hindermann and Kim Bui under the guidance of Tamara Khokhlova and Elena Dolgopolova.

She retired from competitions after the 2008 Olympics. After returning to Berlin, she moved to the Technical University of Ilmenau to study sports and biology.

References

External links
Katja Abel. gymbox.net

1983 births
Living people
People from East Berlin
German female artistic gymnasts
Gymnasts at the 2008 Summer Olympics
Olympic gymnasts of Germany
Gymnasts from Berlin
20th-century German women